Merlin is a family of rocket engines developed by SpaceX for use on its Falcon 1, Falcon 9 and Falcon Heavy launch vehicles. Merlin engines use RP-1 and liquid oxygen as rocket propellants in a gas-generator power cycle. The Merlin engine was originally designed for sea recovery and reuse, but since 2016 the entire Falcon 9 booster is recovered for reuse by landing vertically on a landing pad using one of its nine Merlin engines.

The injector at the heart of Merlin is of the pintle type that was first used in the Apollo Lunar Module landing engine (LMDE). Propellants are fed by a single-shaft, dual-impeller turbopump. The turbopump also provides high-pressure fluid for the hydraulic actuators, which then recycles into the low-pressure inlet. This eliminates the need for a separate hydraulic drive system and means that thrust vectoring control failure by running out of hydraulic fluid is not possible.

Revisions

Merlin 1A
The initial version, the Merlin 1A, used an inexpensive, expendable, ablatively cooled carbon-fiber-reinforced polymer composite nozzle and produced  of thrust.
The Merlin 1A flew only twice: first on March 24, 2006, when it caught fire and failed due to a fuel leak shortly after launch, and the second time on March 21, 2007, when it performed successfully. Both times the Merlin 1A was mounted on a Falcon 1 first stage.

The SpaceX turbopump was an entirely new, clean-sheet design contracted to Barber-Nichols, Inc. in 2002, who performed all design, engineering analysis, and construction; the company had previously worked on turbopumps for the RS-88 (Bantam) and NASA Fastrac engine programs. The Merlin 1A turbopump used a unique friction-welded main shaft, with Inconel 718 ends and an integral aluminum RP-1 impeller in the middle. The turbopump housing was constructed using investment castings, with Inconel at the turbine end, aluminum in the center, and 300-series stainless steel at the LOX end.

Merlin 1B
The Merlin 1B rocket engine was an upgraded version of the Merlin 1A engine. The turbopump upgrades were handled by Barber-Nichols, Inc. for SpaceX.

The turbine upgrade was accomplished by adding additional nozzles, turning the previously partial-admission design to full admission. Slightly enlarged impellers for both RP-1 and LOX were part of the upgrade. This model turned at a faster 22,000 rpm and developed higher discharge pressures.
Another notable change over the 1A was the move to TEA–TEB (pyrophoric) ignition over torch ignition.

Initial use of the Merlin 1B was to be on the Falcon 9 launch vehicle, on whose first stage there would have been a cluster of nine of these engines. Due to experience from the Falcon 1's first flight, SpaceX moved its Merlin development to the Merlin 1C, which is regeneratively cooled. Therefore, the Merlin 1B was never used on a launch vehicle.

Merlin 1C

Three versions of the Merlin 1C engine were produced. The Merlin engine for Falcon 1 had a movable turbopump exhaust assembly, which was used to provide roll control by vectoring the exhaust. The Merlin 1C engine for the Falcon 9 first stage is nearly identical to the variant used for the Falcon 1, although the turbopump exhaust assembly is not movable. Finally, a Merlin 1C vacuum variant is used on the Falcon 9 second stage. This engine differs from the Falcon 9 first-stage variant in that it uses a larger exhaust nozzle optimized for vacuum operation and can be throttled between 60% and 100%.

The Merlin 1C uses a regeneratively cooled nozzle and combustion chamber. The turbopump used is a Merlin 1B model with only slight alterations. It was fired with a full mission duty firing of 170 seconds in November 2007, first flew on a mission in August 2008, powered the "first developed liquid-fueled rocket to successfully reach orbit", Falcon 1 Flight 4, in September 2008, and powered the Falcon 9 on its maiden flight in June 2010.

In this configuration, the engine consumed  of propellant per second. Tests have been conducted with a single Merlin 1C engine successfully running a total of 27 minutes (counting together the duration of the various tests), which equals ten complete Falcon 1 flights.

A Merlin 1C was first used as part of the unsuccessful third attempt to launch a Falcon 1. In discussing the failure, Elon Musk noted: "The flight of our first stage, with the new Merlin 1C engine that will be used in Falcon 9, was picture perfect." The Merlin 1C was used in the successful fourth flight of Falcon 1 on September 28, 2008.

On October 7, 2012, a Merlin 1C (Engine No. 1) of the CRS-1 mission experienced an anomaly at T+00:01:20, which appears on CRS-1 launch video as a flash. The failure occurred just as the vehicle achieved max-Q (maximum aerodynamic pressure). SpaceX's internal review found that the engine was shut down after a sudden pressure loss and that only the aerodynamic shell was destroyed, generating the debris seen in the video; the engine did not explode, as SpaceX ground control continued to receive data from it throughout the flight. The primary mission was unaffected by the anomaly due to the nominal operation of the remaining eight engines and an onboard readjustment of the flight trajectory, but the secondary-mission payload failed to reach its target orbit due to safety protocols in place to prevent collisions with the ISS. These protocols prevented a second firing of the upper stage for the secondary payload.

SpaceX was planning to develop a  version of Merlin 1C to be used in Falcon 9 Block II and Falcon 1E boosters. This engine and these booster models were dropped in favor of the more advanced Merlin 1D engine and longer Falcon 9 v1.1 booster.

Merlin Vacuum (1C)
On March 10, 2009, a SpaceX press release announced successful testing of the Merlin Vacuum engine. A variant of the 1C engine, Merlin Vacuum features a larger exhaust section and a significantly larger expansion nozzle to maximize the engine's efficiency in the vacuum of space. Its combustion chamber is regeneratively cooled, while the  niobium alloy expansion nozzle is radiatively cooled. The first production Merlin Vacuum engine underwent a full-duration orbital-insertion firing (329 seconds) of the integrated Falcon 9 second stage on January 2, 2010. It was flown on the second stage for the inaugural Falcon 9 flight on June 4, 2010. At full power and as of March 10, 2009, the Merlin Vacuum engine operates with the greatest efficiency of any American-made hydrocarbon-fueled rocket engine.

An unplanned test of a modified Merlin Vacuum engine was made in December 2010. Shortly before the scheduled second flight of the Falcon 9, two cracks were discovered in the  niobium-alloy-sheet nozzle of the Merlin Vacuum engine. The engineering solution was to cut off the lower  of the nozzle and launch two days later, as the extra performance that would have been gained from the longer nozzle was not necessary to meet the objectives of the mission. The modified engine successfully placed the second stage into an orbit of  altitude.

Merlin 1D
The Merlin 1D engine was developed by SpaceX between 2011 and 2012, with first flight in 2013. The design goals for the new engine included increased reliability, improved performance, and improved manufacturability. Merlin 1D was originally designed to throttle between 100% and 70% of maximal thrust; however, further refinements since 2013 now allow the engine to throttle to 40%.

The basic Merlin fuel/oxidizer mixture ratio is controlled by the sizing of the propellant supply tubes to each engine, with only a small amount of the total flow trimmed out by a "servo-motor-controlled butterfly valve" to provide fine control of the mixture ratio.

This version of the Merlin 1D was used on Falcon 9 Full Thrust and first flew on Flight 20.

SpaceX also noted that unlike the previous Full Thrust iteration of the Falcon 9 vehicle, the increase in performance is solely due to upgraded engines, and no other significant changes to the vehicle are publicly planned.

In May 2018, ahead of the first flight of Falcon 9 Block 5, SpaceX announced that the  goal had been achieved. The Merlin 1D is now close to the sea-level thrust of the retired Rocketdyne H-1 / RS-27 engines used on Saturn I, Saturn IB, and Delta II.

Anomalies 
The March 18, 2020, launch of Starlink satellites on board a Falcon 9 experienced an early engine shutdown on ascent. The shutdown occurred 2 minutes 22 seconds into the flight and was accompanied with an "event" seen on camera. The rest of the Falcon 9 engines burned longer and did deliver the payload to orbit. However, the first stage was not successfully recovered. In a subsequent investigation SpaceX found that isopropyl alcohol, used as cleaning fluid, was trapped and ignited, causing the engine to be shut down. To address the issue, in a following launch SpaceX indicated that the cleaning process was not done.

On October 2, 2020, the launch of a GPS-III satellite was aborted at T-2 seconds due to a detected early startup on 2 of the 9 engines on the first stage. The engines were removed for further testing and it was found that a port in the gas generator was blocked. After removing the blockage the engines started as intended. After this, SpaceX inspected other engines across its fleet and found that two of the engines on the Falcon 9 rocket intended for the Crew-1 launch also had this problem. Those engines were replaced with new M1D engines.

On February 16, 2021, on Falcon 9 flight 108 launching Starlink satellites, an engine shut down early due to hot exhaust gasses passing through a damaged heat-shielding cover. The mission was a success, but the booster could not be recovered.

Merlin 1D Vacuum
A vacuum version of the Merlin 1D engine was developed for the Falcon 9 v1.1 and the Falcon Heavy second stage. The increase is due to the greater expansion ratio afforded by operating in vacuum, now 165:1 using an updated nozzle extension.

Design

Engine control
SpaceX uses a triple-redundant design in the Merlin engine computers. The system uses three computers in each processing unit, each constantly checking on the others, to instantiate a fault-tolerant design. One processing unit is part of each of the ten Merlin engines (nine on the first stage, one on the second stage) used on the Falcon 9 launch vehicle.

Turbopump
The Merlin LOX/RP-1 turbopump used on Merlin engines 1A–1C was designed and developed by Barber-Nichols. It spins at 36,000 revolutions per minute, delivering .

Gas generator
The LOX/RP-1 turbopump on each Merlin engine is powered by a fuel-rich open-cycle gas generator similar to that used in the Apollo-era Rocketdyne F-1 engine.

Production
, SpaceX was producing Merlin engines at the rate of eight per month, planning eventually to raise production to about 33 engines per month (or 400 per year).
By October 2014, SpaceX announced that it had manufactured the 100th Merlin 1D engine and that engines were now being produced at a rate of four per week, soon to be increased to five.

In February 2016, SpaceX indicated that the company will need to build hundreds of engines a year in order to support a Falcon 9/Falcon Heavy build rate of 30 rocket cores per year by the end of 2016.

Each Falcon 9 booster uses nine Merlin engines, and the second stage uses one Merlin vacuum engine. The second stage is expended, so each launch consumes one Merlin Vacuum engine. SpaceX designed the booster with its engines to be recovered for reuse by propulsive landing, and the first recovered booster was reused in March 2017. By 2020, only five of the 26 Falcon 9 launches used new boosters. These 26 launches used 25 new Merlin Vacuum engines and 45 new sea-level Merlin engines. By 2021, only two of the 31 Falcon 9 launches used new boosters. In the first half of 2022, there were 27 Falcon 9 launches, two of which used a new booster.

See also

 SpaceX Draco – SpaceX RCS thruster for SpaceX Dragon
 SpaceX Kestrel – SpaceX small upper stage engine for Falcon 1
 SpaceX Raptor – SpaceX methane/LOX engine for the Starship
Falcon 1 – First rocket powered by Merlin 1A
 Comparison of orbital rocket engines
 Rocket engine
 Pintle injector
 TR-106 – Low Cost Pintle Engine (LCPE) using LOX/LH2 developed by TRW in 2000
 TR-107 – RP-1 engine developed under SLI for future reusable launch vehicles
 RS-27A – RP-1 engine used in the US Delta II launcher; Saturn 1B H-1 heritage
 Rocketdyne F-1 – LOX/RP-1 main engine of the Saturn V moon rocket

References

Sources

External links

 SpaceX official website

SpaceX rocket engines
Rocket engines using kerosene propellant
Rocket engines using the gas-generator cycle
Rocket engines of the United States